"" is the 40th single by Zard and released 20 April 2005 under the B-Gram Records label. The composer of Natsu wo Matsu Sail no Yō ni, Aika Ohno self-cover this single in her cover album Silent Passage.

The single reached #2 rank first week. It charted for 13 weeks and sold over 79,000 copies. Till date it is the last single which was included in Zard studio album.

Track list
All songs are written by Izumi Sakai, composed by Aika Ohno and arranged by Takeshi Hayama

the song was used as 15th opening theme for anime Detective Conan

the song was used as theme song for anime movie Detective Conan: Strategy Above the Depths
 (original karaoke)
 (original karaoke)

References

2005 singles
Zard songs
Case Closed songs
Songs written by Izumi Sakai
Songs written by Aika Ohno
2005 songs